Thomas Baron Pitfield (5 April 190311 November 1999) was a British composer, poet, artist, engraver, calligrapher, craftsman, furniture builder and teacher.

Life
He was born in Bolton to elderly parents whose strict Victorian values and lack of support for his creative interests led his withdrawn from school at 14 for a seven-year engineering apprenticeship with Hick, Hargreaves & Co. Ltd, his designs for transmission machinery for the cotton industry survive with indian ink and watercolour paintings of railway engines.

Although he was essentially self-taught as a composer, he studied piano, cello and harmony at the Royal Manchester College of Music, where his teachers were Thomas Keighley, Frank Merrick and Carl Fuchs. In 1930 he won a scholarship to study art and cabinet-making at the Bolton School of Art.
  
After training as a teacher, he became art master at Tettenhall College, Wolverhampton. Whilst there, as a pacifist, he joined the Peace Pledge Union. In the Second World War, he registered as a conscientious objector, with a condition that he continue teaching. He taught composition at the Royal Manchester College of Music from 1947 to 1973, where his pupils included David Ellis, John Golland, John McCabe, John Ogdon and Ronald Stevenson.

Pitfield was a lifelong vegetarian. Between 1986 and 1993 he wrote a three volume autobiography. He continued to create art and music until his nineties. He died in Bowdon, Greater Manchester, in 1999.

Composition

As a composer Pitfield was influenced by Ralph Vaughan Williams, Percy Grainger and Frederick Delius. He was a prolific composer and his compositions include collections of miniatures for students and amateurs, a five-movement Sinfonietta, a Trio for flute, oboe and piano, concertos for piano, violin, recorder and percussion, a Xylophone Sonata, an Oboe Sonata,  and solo works for accordion, clarsach, and harmonica. He also invented an instrument called “patterphone” to produce rain-like sounds.

He wrote for many notable artists, such as Léon Goossens, Evelyn Rothwell, Archie Camden, Dolmetsch, and Osian Ellis.

His music was published by more than 50 publishers. Hubert J. Foss of the Oxford University Press published many of his compositions, illustrations, frontispieces and cover-designs, which he made for various publications, including the one for Benjamin Britten's Simple Symphony.

References

External links
 In memoriam Thomas Pitfield: Master of arts
Piperpublications - Thomas Pitfield

1903 births
1999 deaths
20th-century classical composers
20th-century classical pianists
20th-century English composers
20th-century British male musicians
20th-century British musicians
British conscientious objectors
English autobiographers
English classical composers
English classical pianists
English designers
English male classical composers
British male pianists
English pacifists
Light music composers
Male classical pianists
People from Bolton